The Wedding Present's discography consists of 54 singles, 17 extended plays, 9 studio albums, 24 live albums and 21 compilation albums. The band were formed in 1985 in Leeds, England by David Gedge, Peter Solowka and Keith Gregory. At the height of their popularity the band had a run of twelve top-30 singles in twelve months, equalling a record set by Elvis Presley.

Albums

Studio albums

Live albums

Compilation albums

Box sets

Video albums

Other albums

EPs

Singles

References

External links
 Official website

 
Discographies of British artists